Dicymolomia is a genus of moths of the family Crambidae.

Species
Dicymolomia diminutalis 
Dicymolomia grisea 
Dicymolomia julianalis (Walker, 1859)
Dicymolomia metalliferalis (Packard, 1873)
Dicymolomia metalophota (Hampson, 1897)
Dicymolomia micropunctalis 
Dicymolomia opuntialis 
Dicymolomia rufifusalis (Hampson, 1912)

References

Glaphyriinae
Taxa named by Philipp Christoph Zeller
Crambidae genera